This is a list of NCAA National Invitation Tournament all-time records, as of 2022.  Schools whose names are italicized are no longer in Division I, and can no longer be included in the tournament.

See also
NIT bids by school
NIT championships and semifinal appearances

College men's basketball records and statistics in the United States